Gianfrancesco Sigfrido Benedetto Marinenghi de Guarnieri (August 6, 1934 – July 22, 2006) was an Italian–Brazilian actor, lyricist, poet and playwright. He was a key participant in the Arena Theater of São Paulo, his most important work was "They Don't Wear Black Tie".

Biography
He was born in Milan, 6 August 1934, to a couple of antifascist musicians. His parents, the maestro Edoardo Guarnieri and the Harpist Elsa Martineghi, decided to move to Brazil in 1936, finding a new home in Rio de Janeiro. In the beginning of the 1950s, they moved again to São Paulo.

A student leader since his teenage years, Guarnieri began to do amateur theater with Oduvaldo Vianna Filho (Vianinha) and a group of students from São Paulo. In 1955 they created the "Paulista Theater of the Student" (Teatro Paulista do Estudante), with guidance from Ruggero Jacobbi. In the next year that theater joined up with The Arena Theater, founded and directed by José Renato

Career

Theater
His first play was "They Don't Wear Black Tie", put on stage for the first time in 1958 in the Arena Theater Directed by José Renato, the case had great talents that had begun to attract attention, like Guarnieri himself, Leila Abramo, Miriam Melhler, Flavio Migliaccio, Eugênio Kusnet, Francisco de Assis, Henrique César, Celeste Lima, Riva Nimtz, and Milton Gonçalves;

It was set to end the collective project, since they were having financial problems, but it had immense success. The play, author and cast were given awards by the governor of São Paulo State, Janio Quadros, and the arena was saved from its financial troubles. Around the same time Guarnieri also starred in "O Grande Momento" by Director Roberto Santos, the beginning of a new wave in cinema in Brazil called "Cinema Novo".

Selected filmography
The Hour and Turn of Augusto Matraga (1965; writer)
A Muralha (1968; actor)
Gaijin: Roads to Freedom (1980; actor)
Asa Branca: Um Sonho Brasileiro (1981; actor)
They Don't Wear Black Tie (1981; writer and actor)
Rainha da Sucata (1990; actor) - Irineu Saldanha
Mundo da Lua (1991; actor) - Vô Orlando
A Próxima Vítima (1995, TV Series) - Eliseu Giardini
Esperança (2002; actor)
Belíssima (2005; actor)

External links 

 

1934 births
2006 deaths
Male actors from Milan
Brazilian male film actors
Brazilian male television actors
Brazilian male dramatists and playwrights
20th-century Brazilian dramatists and playwrights
20th-century Brazilian male writers
Italian emigrants to Brazil
Italian male film actors
Italian male television actors
Italian male dramatists and playwrights
20th-century Italian dramatists and playwrights
20th-century Italian male writers
Deaths from kidney failure